Group E of the 2015 FIFA Women's World Cup consisted of Brazil, South Korea, Spain and Costa Rica. Matches were played from 9 to 17 June 2015.

Teams

Standings

In the round of 16:
Brazil advanced to play Australia (runner-up of Group D).
South Korea advanced to play France (winner of Group F).

Matches

Spain vs Costa Rica

Brazil vs South Korea

Brazil vs Spain

South Korea vs Costa Rica

Costa Rica vs Brazil

South Korea vs Spain

References

External links
Official website

Group E
2014–15 in Costa Rican football
Group
2015 in South Korean football
2014–15 in Spanish women's football